Ward 12 Toronto—St. Paul's is a municipal electoral division in Toronto, Ontario that has been represented in the Toronto City Council since the 2018 municipal election. It was last contested in 2018, with Josh Matlow elected councillor for the 2018–2022 term.

History 
The ward was created in 2018 when the provincial government aligned Toronto's then-44 municipal wards with the 25 corresponding provincial and federal ridings. The current ward is made up of parts of the former Ward 21 St. Paul, the former Ward 22 St. Paul and the southern portion of the former Ward 15 Eglinton—Lawrence.

2018 municipal election 
Ward 12 was first contested during the 2018 municipal election with six candidates, including Ward 21 incumbent Joe Mihevc and Ward 22 incumbent Josh Matlow. Matlow was ultimately elected with 51.60 per cent of the vote, beating Mihevc, who received 42.14 per cent.

Geography 
Ward 12 is part of the Toronto and East York community council.

Toronto—St. Paul's approximate boundaries are Winona Drive, Rogers Road and Dufferin Street on the west, and Eglinton Avenue, Yonge Street and Broadway Avenue on the north. On the east, its boundaries are Mount Pleasant Road, the Mount Pleasant Cemetery and Yonge Street, and the Canadian Pacific (CP) Railway line on the south side.

The ward consists of part of the Fairbank, Humewood-Cedarvale, Hillcrest-Bracondale, Wychwood Park, part of Davenport, Casa Loma, Forest Hill, Tarragon Village, Rathnelly, South Hill, Summerhill, Rosehill, Chaplin Estates, Deer Park and Davisville and part of North Toronto neighbourhoods.

Councillors

Election results

See also 

 Municipal elections in Canada
 Municipal government of Toronto
 List of Toronto municipal elections

References

External links 

 Councillor's webpage

Toronto city council wards
2018 establishments in Ontario